Manuel Costas is the name of:

Manuel Costas (footballer, born 1942), Spanish footballer
Manuel Costas (footballer, born 1947), Spanish footballer
Manuel Costas (politician), Peruvian politician